Belgamba railway station is a closed station on the Main North railway line in the  New England region of New South Wales, Australia. The station was located there between 1937 and 1971.

References

Disused regional railway stations in New South Wales
Railway stations in Australia opened in 1937
Railway stations closed in 1971
Main North railway line, New South Wales